Hero Nero is a 2016 Sri Lankan Sinhala children's adventure film directed by Pradeep Mahesh Liyanage and produced by Nishantha Pradeep Mohottige for Screen Works Films. It stars Mahinda Pathirage, Duleeka Marapana, and Nilmini Tennakoon in lead roles along with Sangeetha Weeraratne and Niroshan Wijesinghe. Music composed by Shameel J. It is the 1263rd Sri Lankan film in the Sinhalese cinema. The film has influenced by 2011 Bollywood film Chillar Party, which is about saving pets.

Plot

Cast
 Duleeka Marapana as Mrs. Lionel
 Mahinda Pathirage as Minister Lionel
 Nilmini Tennakoon as Priya Senarathne
 Sangeetha Weeraratne as himself
 Otara Gunewardene in cameo appearance 
 Niroshan Wijesinghe as Mr. Senarathne
 Anjali Liyanage
 Lakshika Fonseka as Veterinary surgeon
 D.B. Gangodathenna
 Pavith Thanura as Ravindu
 Chanaka Madushan as Dunstan
 Malidu Thiwanka as Little monk
 Nihindu Omal as Gadget
 Sonal Stephan as Seek
 Poshini Nadee as Karate
 Rohan Aravinda as Innocent
 Mamoj Wickramasinghe as Kachal
 Thilina Lakshan as Negative
 Ranjan Ramanayake in special appearance
 Roy de Silva in special appearance 
 Niro the dog

Soundtrack

References

2016 films
2010s Sinhala-language films
2010s adventure films
Sri Lankan adventure films